Gloucester is an unincorporated area and census-designated place (CDP) in Carteret County, North Carolina, United States. As of the 2010 census it had a population of 537.

Geography

Gloucester is located just east of the center of Carteret County, on the northern side of The Straits, a tidal channel connecting Core Sound to the east with the North River to the west. The Gloucester CDP is bounded by Whitehurst Creek to the west and Sleepy Creek to the east, both tidal inlets from The Straits.

Demographics

See also

References

External links

Census-designated places in Carteret County, North Carolina
Census-designated places in North Carolina
Populated coastal places in North Carolina